Franz Carl Weiskopf (3 April 1900 in Prague – 14 September 1955) was a German-speaking writer. Born in Prague, then part of Austria-Hungary, he was often referred to as F. C. Weiskopf, he also used the pseudonyms Petr Buk, Pierre Buk and F. W. L. Kovacs. He died in Berlin in 1955.

The Life of a Writer 

Weiskopf was the son of a German banker who was Jewish and a Czech mother. He studied at a German school in Prague and then went to university in his hometown to study Germanistik and history from 1919–1923. He traveled to the Soviet Union in 1926 and in 1928 moved to Berlin where he became editor of the Berlin am Morgen newspaper. He married Grete Bernheim. He was a member in good standing of the Confederation of Proletarian Revolutionary Writers (German: Bund proletarisch-revolutionärer Schriftsteller) and participated in a conference in 1930 with Anna Seghers in Charkow in the Soviet Union.

After the takeover by the Nazis in 1933 Weiskopf returned to Prague, where he was editor of the Arbeiter-Illustrierte-Zeitung. When Czechoslovakia fell to the invading Germans in October 1938, the newspaper was forced to shut down, and Weiskopf fled to Paris. From there, he fled to the United States in April 1939, with the help of the League of American Writers. He survived the war in New York.

After the end of the war, Weiskopf was in the diplomatic service of Czechoslovakia and worked, first at an Embassy in Washington DC, 1949 to 1950 as ambassador to Stockholm, and from 1950 to 1952 as ambassador to Beijing. In 1952 he returned to Prague, but moved in 1953 to East Berlin. In the last years of his life he was a board member of the Deutscher Schriftstellerverband, and published the magazine New German Literature (German: Neue Deutsche Literatur) together with Willi Bredel and became member of PEN.

F.C. Weiskopf wrote novels, short stories, stories, anecdotes, poetry and essays. His work was always realistic, stylistically far above the average for other authors of the Socialist realism. His narrative works were mostly set in the middle of Czechoslovakia and describe the path of solidarity of citizens and workers since the First World War.

His wife initiated a Weiskopf named Prize, which has been awarded since 1956 for contribution to the preservation of the German language.

Works

Editorials 

 Januartage, Prag-Karlin 1926
 Denise Leblond-Zola: Zola, Berlin 1932
 Hundred towers, New York 1945
 Kisch-Kalender, Berlin 1955

Translations 

 Tschechische Lieder, Berlin 1925
 Das Herz - ein Schild, London 1937
 Gesang der gelben Erde, Berlin 1951
 Chien Tien: Des Tien Tschien Lied vom Karren, Berlin 1953
 Max Švabinský: Schmetterlingszeit, Prag 1954

Films 
 1957: Lissy - Director: Konrad Wolf
 1977: Abschied vom Frieden - Director: Hans-Joachim Kasprzik

Further reading 

 Franziska Arndt: Vorläufige Bibliographie der literarischen Arbeiten von und über F. C. Weiskopf  (1900–1955), Berlin 1958 (zusammen mit Achim Roscher)
 Marianne Angermüller: Vorläufiges Findbuch des literarischen Nachlasses von F. C. Weiskopf (1900–1955), Berlin
 Bd. 1. Unterlagen aus der literarischen Tätigkeit von F. C. Weiskopf, 1958
 Grete Weiskopf (Hrsg.): Erinnerungen an einen Freund, Berlin 1963
  Weiskopf, Franz Carl. In: Lexikon sozialistischer deutscher Literatur. Leipzig 1964, S. 537-540 mit Bibliografie, S. 540.
 Franziska Arndt: F. C. Weiskopf, Leipzig 1965
 Ludvík Václavek: F. C. Weiskopf und die Tschechoslowakei, Praha 1965
 Irmfried Hiebel: F. C. Weiskopf, Schriftsteller und Kritiker, Berlin [u. a.] 1973
 Petra Gallmeister: Die historischen Romane von F. C. Weiskopf „Abschied vom Frieden“ und „Inmitten des Stroms“, Frankfurt am Main [u. a.] 1983
 Volker Haase: „Will man nicht 70 Millionen ausmerzen oder kastrieren ...“. Ein Beitrag zu F. C. Weiskopfs deutschlandpolitischen Vorstellungen im Exil. In: Literarische und politische Deutschlandkonzepte 1938-1949. Hrsg. von Gunther Nickel, Göttingen 2004, S. 239-269
 Volker Weidermann: Das Buch der verbrannten Bücher. Köln: Verlag Kiepenheuer & Witsch, 2008; . (Zu Weiskopf Seite 55/57)

External links 

 
 F. C. Weiskopf: Umsteigen ins 21. Jahrhundert (1927)
 Biographie
 Biografie im Autorenlexikon des Adalbert Stifter-Vereins

1900 births
1955 deaths
20th-century Czech people
20th-century German writers
Czech people of German-Jewish descent
Czechoslovak people of German descent
Czech writers in German
Jewish Czech writers
Czech male writers
Writers from Prague
Ambassadors of Czechoslovakia to Sweden
Ambassadors of Czechoslovakia to China
Jewish emigrants from Nazi Germany to the United States
20th-century German male writers